Entoloma politum  is a species of fungus in the Entolomataceae family. It is found in Europe and North America.

See also
List of Entoloma species

References

External links

Entolomataceae
Fungi of Europe
Fungi of North America
Fungi described in 1794
Taxa named by Christiaan Hendrik Persoon